Egmont may refer to:

 Egmont Group, a media corporation founded and rooted in Copenhagen, Denmark
 Egmond family (often spelled "Egmont"), an influential Dutch family, lords of the town of Egmond
 Lamoral, Count of Egmont (1522–1568), the best known member of the Egmont family
 Egmont (play), a play by Goethe, about Lamoral, Count of Egmond
 Egmont (Beethoven), the overture and incidental music by Beethoven composed for the play
 Egmond (municipality), a town in North Holland, the Netherlands
 Egmont pact, a Belgian political agreement (1977)
 Egmont Palace, in Brussels, Belgium
 Egmont Islands, a group of Indian Ocean islands, part of the Chagos Archipelago
 EGMONT - The Royal Institute for International Relations, a think tank in Brussels, Belgium
Mount Egmont is the alternative name for Mount Taranaki in New Zealand
 Egmont National Park, a national park at Mount Taranaki
 Egmont (New Zealand electorate), a former electoral district in Taranaki, New Zealand
 Egmont Village, a village north of Mount Taranaki
Egmont (electoral district), a Federal Canadian electoral district
Egmont Group of Financial Intelligence Units, and the international network of Financial Intelligence Units
Egmont Key State Park, located in Florida, US
Egmont, British Columbia, a town in British Columbia, Canada
HMS Egmont, the name of several ships of the Royal Navy
Egmont H. Petersens Kollegium, a Dormitory in Copenhagen
Lake Egmont, Nova Scotia

See also 
 Egmond (disambiguation)